Terry Wey (born 15 September 1985) is a classical countertenor, specialising in historically informed performance. As a boy soprano, he was a soloist of the Wiener Sängerknaben.

Born in Bern in a Swiss-American family of musicians, Wey began his vocal training as a member of the Wiener Sängerknaben and also studied the piano. From 2003, he appeared internationally in concert- and opera. His love of Renaissance music made him join the vocal ensemble Cinquecento.

Selected recordings 

 Tommaso Albinoni: Il Nascimento dell’Aurora (2007)
 Stefano Landi: Il Sant’Alessio (2008)
 Johann Sebastian Bach: Mass in B minor (2008)
 George Frederic Handel: Israel in Egypt (2008)
 Claudio Monteverdi: Il Ritorno d'Ulisse in Patria (2010)
 Bach: Es ist ein trotzig und verzagt Ding, BWV 176 (2014)

References

External links 

 
 
 Terry Wey autobiography, boychoirs.org 2002

Countertenors
1985 births
Living people
American people of Swiss descent
People from Bern